The Armenian American lobby is the diverse coalition of those who, as individuals and as groups, seek to influence the United States foreign policy in support of Armenia, Armenians or Armenian policies. One of its primary goals is for the United States to recognize the Armenian genocide, but the Turkish lobby have, until recently, successfully lobbied against this.

Organization 
The Armenian lobby is almost exclusively formed by domestic organizations such as the Armenian National Committee of America and the Armenian Assembly of America, leaving the Armenian Government largely out of the lobbying process. The two organizations have similar lobbying goals, mostly revolving around improving U.S. relations with Armenia in terms of aid, blocking aid to Turkey and Azerbaijan, as well as their ultimate goal of Armenian genocide recognition. However, the two groups provide different approaches to promoting the Armenian cause. The ANCA focuses mostly on grassroots initiatives to mobilize a highly concentrated Armenian electorate. On the other hand, the AAA focuses on retaining large donations from influential Armenians in America. The AAA draws upon the AIPAC model, which is very much centered on influencing foreign policy. The competition between these two groups creates a "hyper-mobilization" of resources in the Armenian community, because the two organizations also have similar goals.

The strength of the Armenian lobby can be derived from its concentration in a few congressional districts, such as California's 30th congressional district. In the 2000 census, one-third of the Armenian-American community lived in just 5 districts of the 106th Congress. Half of all Armenian-Americans lived in just 20 congressional district. This high population concentration allows the Armenian-Community to greatly sway votes, especially in a time of low voter turn out. One case study of this is when Democratic challenger and current Congressman Adam Schiff won against Republican incumbent Jim Rogan. Schiff effectively captured much of the Armenian vote, and now current champions Armenian issues in Congress. The Armenian community can also draw on its power of partial assimilation—it is not too assimilated like ethnic groups such as German Americans but it has had a presence in the U.S. since the early 1900s

Effectiveness 
While the Armenian lobby had been effective in a number of public relations campaigns in the late 20th century, it is now almost completely overshadowed by the Turkish lobby which exaggerated the influence of the Armenian lobby to increase its own lobbying efforts.

Some of its achievements in the second half of the 20th century were $90 million in aid annually for Armenia, the continuation of Section 907 of the Freedom Support Act blocking aid to Azerbaijan, success in stalling an arms deal with Turkey during the 1970s, and limited support for US recognition (only in US states, never officially) of the Armenian genocide; 46 U.S. states recognize the genocide. Armenia received the second highest U.S. aid per capita behind Israel.

It has been unsuccessful in getting the United States government to recognize the Armenian genocide, which has been its primary goal. It also failed to discourage the US from reducing its financial aid to Armenia while increased aid to Azerbaijan, at a time when Armenia sent soldiers to Iraq and announced it would send soldiers to Afghanistan in support of the US-led campaign. Furthermore, US diplomats have repeatedly asserted that Armenia has to demonstrate flexibility regarding the Nagorno-Karabakh conflict before Turkey can involve itself.

The Armenian lobby has been subdued by the Turkish and Azerbaijani lobbies. In contrast to the Armenian lobby, the Turkish lobby mostly runs through its government. A study on ethnic lobbies and their effect on U.S. foreign policy indicated that the Turkish embassy is more active than Turkish-American organizations in attempting to influence U.S. regional foreign policy. Because the Republic of Turkey cannot legally finance campaigns, it relies on contracting Washington lobbying firms and contacting members of congress and their staff. In 2008, the Turkish government spent $3,524,632 on Washington lobbying activities and contacted members of Congress 2,268 times. Utilizing top lobbying firms such as the Livingston Group, which has represented other Middle Eastern clients such as Egypt and Libya, the Turkish government gained invaluable Washington resources.

Lobby organizations 
The Armenian American Political Action Committee (A.A.P.A.C.), is a political action committee  founded by Albert A. Boyajian.
The Armenian National Committee of America works to initiate legislation on issues of concern to the Armenian American community, such as strengthening Armenia as a secure, prosperous and democratic state; supporting Nagorno Karabagh's right to self-determination and independence within secure borders; increasing U.S. aid levels to Armenia to promote economic and democratic development; securing direct U.S. aid to Nagorno Karabagh; ensuring the appropriate commemoration of the Armenian genocide; and encouraging Turkey and Azerbaijan to lift their blockades and adhere to international standards for human rights and humanitarian practices.
The Armenian Assembly of America aims to "strengthen U.S./Armenia and U.S./Nagorno Karabakh relations, promotes Armenia's and Karabakh's democratic development and economic prosperity and seeks universal affirmation of the Armenian genocide" via "research, education and advocacy."
The Armenian Youth Federation-Youth Organization Of The Armenian Revolutionary Federation (AYF-YOARF).  In the early 1990s the AYF found a new challenge: Nagorno-Karabakh. In 1988 the struggle for independence in the Karabagh region started. AYF became involved in fund raising activities to supply much-needed funds to the people in Karabakh. Even after the independence of Nagorno-Karabagh in 1991 and the cease-fire in 1993, the AYF continued to help the region. In 1994 the AYF Western Region decided to create a program, called the AYF Youth Corps, that sent about ten youths that year and continues to send up to 15 each summer. The mission of the Youth Corps is to help rebuild schools, camps, churches, etc. in the various regions of Nagorno-Karabakh.

References

Foreign policy political advocacy groups in the United States
Armenia–United States relations
Lobbying in the United States